Fayge Ilanit (née Hindes) (7 February 1909 – 14 July 2002) was a Zionist activist and Israeli politician. She was a granddaughter of Rabbi Shimon Shkop and mother of IDF soldier Uri Ilan.

Biography
Fayge Ilanit was born Fayge Hindes in Brańsk in the Russian Empire (now Poland) in 1909 to Sharaga Hindes and Hannah Shkop (daughter of Rabbi Shimon Shkop). Fayge moved with her family to Ukraine in 1915 but returned to Poland in 1922. After her mother's death and her father's remarriage, Fayge then lived with her grandfather. In 1928, Fayge joined Hashomer Hatzair and, in 1929, she immigrated to Mandatory Palestine.

In 1933, Fayge joined kibbutz Gan Shmuel. She then married Shlomo Ilan and, in 1935, she gave birth to her firstborn child, Uri Ilan. She and her husband had three other children: Roni, Hannah, and Shimon. Fayge was active in the “Women’s Labor Council” and was a member of the secretariat of the “Women’s Labor Council”. She was also a member of the central institutions of Mapam and was active in the League for Friendly Relations with the Soviet Union. Fayge was also a member of the Haganah.

Fayge was elected to the first Knesset for Mapam and was a member of the House and Education and Culture Committees.  She opposed the Palestine Communist Party and rejected claims of anti-religious coercion in the immigrant camps.

She became blind in her old age and died in 2002.

References

External links

1909 births
2002 deaths
Israeli communists
Women members of the Knesset
Mapam politicians
People from Białystok
Polish emigrants to Mandatory Palestine
Jewish socialists
Members of the 1st Knesset (1949–1951)
20th-century Israeli women politicians